Morris County USD 417 is a public unified school district headquartered in Council Grove, Kansas, United States.  The district includes the communities of Alta Vista, Council Grove, Diamond Springs, Dunlap, Dwight, Wilsey, Delavan, and nearby rural areas.

Schools
The school district operates the following schools:
 Council Grove Junior Senior High School
 Council Grove Elementary School
 Prairie Heights Elementary School

See also
 Kansas State Department of Education
 Kansas State High School Activities Association
 List of high schools in Kansas
 List of unified school districts in Kansas

References

External links
 

School districts in Kansas
Education in Morris County, Kansas